Sara Brita Stridsberg (born 29 August 1972) is a Swedish author and playwright. Her first novel, Happy Sally was about Sally Bauer, who in 1939 had become the first Scandinavian woman to swim the English Channel.

Her big international breakthrough came with the publication of The Faculty of Dreams/Valerie in 2006. The novel received the Nordic Council Award in 2007, and was nominated to the Man Booker award when published 2019 in the UK and US. Her novels are today translated into 25 languages.

In 2007, she was awarded the Nordic Council's Literature Prize for her novel Drömfakulteten (Valerie, or The Faculty of Dreams), which is her second novel and a fictitious story about Valerie Solanas, who wrote the SCUM manifesto, which Stridsberg has translated into Swedish. The English translation by Deborah Bragan-Turner was longlisted for the 2019 International Booker Prize.

Svenska Dagbladet called Stridsberg "one of our foremost nature poets" and considered her among the best in contemporary Swedish literature while noting that Stridsberg's novels are always discomforting to read.

In 2016, Stridsberg was elected to the 13th chair on the Swedish Academy previously occupied by Gunnel Vallquist. She was inducted into the Academy on 20 December 2016. On 27 April 2018 she left the Academy, in solidarity with Sara Danius.

Bibliography

 Juristutbildningen ur ett genusperspektiv (non-fiction, 1999)
 Det är bara vi som är ute och åker (non-fiction, 2002)
 Happy Sally (novel, 2004)
 Drömfakulteten (novel, 2006; trans. Valerie, or The Faculty of Dreams: A Novel, 2019)
 Darling River (novel, 2010)
 Mamman och havet (children's book, 2012)
 Beckomberga: Ode till min familj (novel, 2014)
 Kärlekens Antarktis (novel, 2018; trans. The Antarctica of Love, 2021)
 Dyksommar (children's book, 2019)

Plays
2006 – Valerie Jean Solanas ska bli president i Amerika
2009 – Medealand
2012 – Dissekering av ett snöfall
2015 – Beckomberga
2015 – Konsten att falla
2016 – American Hotel

Awards
 2004 The Sveriges Essäfond Prize 
 2006 Aftonbladet's Literature Prize 
 2007 The Nordic Council's Literature Prize
 2013 Dobloug Prize 
 2010 Visiting professor Freie Universität Berlin, Germany
 2015 European Union Prize for Literature (Sweden) for Beckomberga – ode till min familj (The Gravity of Love)

References 

1972 births
Living people
People from Solna Municipality
Swedish-language writers
Swedish women novelists
English–Swedish translators
Nordic Council Literature Prize winners
20th-century Swedish novelists
20th-century Swedish women writers
20th-century translators
21st-century Swedish novelists
21st-century Swedish writers
21st-century Swedish women writers
21st-century translators
Swedish translators
Dobloug Prize winners
Members of the Swedish Academy